Bonni Cohen is an American documentary film producer and director. She is the co-founder of Actual Films, the production company of the documentaries Athlete A, An Inconvenient Sequel: Truth to Power, Audrie & Daisy, 3.5 Minutes, The Island President, Lost Boys of Sudan and The Rape of Europa. Cohen is the co-founder of the Catapult Film Fund.

Career 
Cohen co-directed Athlete A and An Inconvenient Sequel: Truth to Power. In 2016, Cohen co-directed the film Audrie & Daisy, which premiered at the 2016 Sundance Film Festival where it was acquired by Netflix.

Cohen is the producer of The Island President, a documentary about the first democratically elected president of the Maldives, Mohamed Nasheed. In 2009, Cohen produced the film Wonders are Many, directed by Jon Else, which premiered at the Sundance Film Festival in 2007. Cohen co-directed Inside Guantanamo with Else. Cohen also served as Executive Producer of the documentary films 3.5 Minutes and Art and Craft.

Filmography

Directed features 
 Athlete A (2020)
 Just Breathe (2019, documentary short)
 An Inconvenient Sequel: Truth to Power (2017)
 Audrie & Daisy (2016)
 National Geographic Explorer (2007-2009, series, 3 episodes)
 Inside Guantanamo (2009)
 Inside Bethlehem (2007)
 The Last Christians of Bethlehem (2007)
 The Rape of Europa (2006)
 Wild on the Set (2000, series, 1 episode, 2000) 
 Snakes (2000, second director)
 Primates (2000)
 Kofi Annan: Eye of the Storm (1998)
 Meet Me in Miami Beach (1994, documentary short)

Producing credits 
 Freedom to Dream (2020, documentary short, executive producer)
 Jaiquan's Sketch (2019, documentary short, executive producer)
 Cooking for Life (2019, documentary short, executive producer)
 Sounds of Life (2019, documentary short, executive producer)
 Cooked: Survival by Zip Code (2019, consulting producer)
 Be Like Water (2019, documentary short, executive producer)
 Drawn to the Mat (2019, documentary short, executive producer)
 Just Breathe (2019, documentary short, executive producer)
 Nature: No App Required (2019, documentary short, executive producer)
 Splash (2019, documentary short, executive producer)
 The Seer and the Unseen (2019, executive producer)
 Life Overtakes Me (2019, documentary short, executive producer)
 When God Sleeps (2017, executive producer)
 Melting Ice (2017, documentary short, co-producer)
 Extremis (2016, documentary short, executive producer)
 Audrie & Daisy (2016, producer)
 P.O.V. (2015, series, executive producer, 1 episode)
 Art and Craft 
 3 1/2 Minutes, 10 Bullets (2015, executive producer)
 The Last Season (2014, consulting producer)
 Art and Craft (2014, executive producer)
 American Jerusalem: Jews and the Making of San Francisco (2013, executive producer)
 Independent Lens (2008–2013, series, producer, 2 episodes)
 Island President (2013)
 Wonders Are Many: The Making of "Doctor Atomic" (2008)
 The Island President (2011, producer)
 National Geographic Explorer (2007, series, producer, 1 episode)
 The Last Christians of Bethlehem
 Undercover History (2007, series, producer, 1 episode)
 J. Edgar Hoover
 Wonders Are Many (2007, producer)
 The Rape of Europa (2006, executive producer, producer)
 Open Outcry (2001, producer)
 They Drew Fire (2000, producer)
 Kofi Annan: Eye of the Storm (1998, producer)
 The Human Sexes (1997, series, producer)

Awards and nominations 

 1998 Emmy Nominee, Outstanding Non-Fiction Series, The Human Sexes (1997), shared with Sandra Gregory (executive producer), Michael Rosenberg (executive producer), Clive Bromhall (series producer), Clare Hargreaves, Beverley Parr, John Longley, Desmond Morris (host/writer)
 2000 International Documentary Association Award Nominee, Strand Program, They Drew Fire (2000), shared with Nicole Newnham and Brian Lanker
 2007 Boston Jewish Film Festival Award Winner, Best Documentary, The Rape of Europa (2006), shared with Richard Berge and Nicole Newnham (directors)
 2007 Atlanta Jewish Film Festival Award Winner, Best Documentary, The Rape of Europa (2006), shared with Richard Berge and Nicole Newnham (directors)
 2008 Writers Guild of America Award Nominee, Documentary Screenplay, The Rape of Europa (2006), shared with Richard Berge and Nicole Newnham
 2009 News & Documentary Emmy Nominee, Outstanding Individual Achievement in a Craft: Research, The Rape of Europa (2006)
 2009 News & Documentary Emmy Nominee, Outstanding Historical Programming - Long Form, The Rape of Europa (2006)
 2010 News & Documentary Emmy Nominee, Best Documentary, National Geographic Explorer (1985), shared with Jon Else (director), Kathleen Cromley (executive producer), Jonathan Halperin (executive producer), Kim Woodard (executive producer), Robert Zakin (senior producer), Max Salomon (series producer)
 2011 Toronto International Film Festival People's Choice Award Winner, The Island President (2011), shared with Richard Berge
 2011 Doc NYC Nominee, Viewfinders Grand Jury Prize, The Island President (2011), shared with Richard Berge
 2012 International Documentary Association Pare Lorentz Award Winner, The Island President (2011), shared with Jon Shenk (director), Jon Else (executive producer), Richard Berge (producer)
 2013 Producers Guild of America Nominee, Outstanding Producer of Documentary Theatrical Motion Pictures, The Island President (2011)
 2016 Sundance Film Festival Award Nominee, Grand Jury Prize, Audrie & Daisy (2016), shared with Jon Shenk
 2016 News & Documentary Emmy Nominee, Outstanding Coverage of a Current News Story - Long Form, 3½ Minutes, Ten Bullets (2015), shared with Orlando Bagwell (executive producer), Julie Goldman (executive producer), Jeff Skoll (executive producer), Diane Weyermann (executive producer), David Eckles (co-executive producer), Carolyn Hepburn (producer), Minette Nelson (producer), Marc Silver (director)
 2016 News & Documentary Emmy Nominee, Outstanding Arts & Culture Programming, P.O.V. (1988), Art and Craft (2014)
 2017 Cannes Film Festival Nominee, Golden Eye, An Inconvenient Sequel: Truth to Power (2017), shared with Jon Shenk
 2017 San Sebastián International Film Festival Greenpeace Lurra Award Winner, An Inconvenient Sequel: Truth to Power (2017), shared with Jon Shenk
 2017 Emmy Awards Nominee, Outstanding Short Documentary, Extremis (2016), shared with Dan Krauss (producer/director), Julie Goldman (executive producer), Deborah Hoffmann (executive producer), Lisa Kleiner-Chanoff (executive producer)
 2018 British Academy of Film and Television Arts Nominee, Best Documentary, An Inconvenient Sequel: Truth to Power (2017), shared with Jon Shenk
 2020 Critics Choice Documentary Awards Nominee, Athlete A (2020), shared with Jon Shenk

References

External links
Actual Films

American documentary film producers
American women documentary filmmakers
Living people
Year of birth missing (living people)
American documentary film directors
21st-century American women